In functional analysis and related areas of mathematics, Schwartz spaces are topological vector spaces (TVS) whose neighborhoods of the origin have a property similar to the definition of totally bounded subsets. These spaces were introduced by Alexander Grothendieck.

Definition

A Hausdorff locally convex space  with continuous dual ,  is called a Schwartz space if it satisfies any of the following equivalent conditions: 

Properties

Every quasi-complete Schwartz space is a semi-Montel space.  
Every Fréchet Schwartz space is a Montel space.  

The strong dual space of a complete Schwartz space is an ultrabornological space.

Examples and sufficient conditions

 Vector subspace of Schwartz spaces are Schwartz spaces.
 The quotient of a Schwartz space by a closed vector subspace is again a Schwartz space.
 The Cartesian product of any family of Schwartz spaces is again a Schwartz space.
 The weak topology induced on a vector space by a family of linear maps valued in Schwartz spaces is a Schwartz space if the weak topology is Hausdorff.
 The locally convex strict inductive limit of any countable sequence of Schwartz spaces (with each space TVS-embedded in the next space) is again a Schwartz space.

Counter-examples

Every infinite-dimensional normed space is not a Schwartz space.  

There exist Fréchet spaces that are not Schwartz spaces and there exist Schwartz spaces that are not Montel spaces.

See also

References

Bibliography

 
  
  
  
  
   
  
  
  

Functional analysis
Topological vector spaces